Kizhani is a rural locality (a selo) in Botlikhsky District, Republic of Dagestan, Russia. The population was 346 as of 2010. There are 3 streets.

Geography 
Kizhani is located 38 km northeast of Botlikh (the district's administrative centre) by road. Zilo is the nearest rural locality.

References 

Rural localities in Botlikhsky District